Petrônio Gontijo de Alvarenga (born July 5, 1968) is a Brazilian actor.

Filmography

Television

Cinema
 1992 - O Palco
 2000 - Cronicamente Inviável
 2001 - Memórias Póstumas - Brás Cubas (young)
 2001 - Um Show de Verão - Isaac Freire
 2002 - Mutante - Pedro
 2002 - Ofusca
 2003 - Tudo Que Ela Vê - Man
 2003 - Cristina Quer Casar - Viriato Benucci
 2006 - Boleiros 2 - Vencedores e Vencidos - Rafael Benitez
 2016 - Os Dez Mandamentos: O Filme - Aarão
 2018 - Nada a Perder - Edir Macedo
2019 - Nada a Perder 2 - Edir Macedo

References

External links

1968 births
Living people
20th-century Brazilian male actors
21st-century Brazilian male actors
Brazilian people of Spanish descent
Brazilian people of Portuguese descent
Brazilian male film actors
Brazilian male telenovela actors
State University of Campinas alumni
People from Varginha, Minas Gerais